Taffy D. Howard (née Chewning) is an American small business owner and politician serving as a member of the South Dakota House of Representatives from the 33rd district. A Republican, she has served the district since 2017. She unsuccessfully ran for the U.S. House to represent South Dakota's at-large congressional district in 2022.

Early life and education 
Howard was born in Decatur, Georgia. Raised in a military family, she moved to South Dakota as a teenager and graduated from Lincoln High School in Sioux Falls. She earned a Bachelor of Science degree in mathematics from the South Dakota State University.

Career 
Howard served as an officer in the United States Air Force from 1990 to 1994. She was elected to the South Dakota House of Representatives in November 2016 and assumed office on January 10, 2017. Howard also serves as vice chair of the House Committee on Appropriations.

Amid the COVID-19 pandemic in South Dakota, Howard announced her intention to introduce legislation that would prevent private businesses from making vaccination mandatory for employees.

In 2022, Howard supported legislation that would make it legal for doctors to prescribe ivermectin to treat COVID-19. There was no evidence to indicate that the drug was effective in treating COVID and there was nothing that prohibited doctors from prescribing it.

2022 congressional election

On August 2, 2021, Howard filed a statement of organization with the Federal Elections Commission to form an exploratory committee for the 2022 United States House of Representatives election in South Dakota. On October 12, 2021, Howard officially announced that she would challenge U.S. Representative Dusty Johnson in the Republican primary. On June 7, 2021, Johnson defeated Howard, 59%–40%.

Electoral history
 In November 2020, Howard was re-elected with 7,902 votes along with Phil Jensen, who received 10,251 votes. In June 2020, Howard received 2,831 votes and Phil Jensen received 2,297 votes to win the primary election defeating Melanie Torno who received 1,620 votes.
 In November 2018, Howard was re-elected with 5,662 votes along with David Johnson who received 6,094 votes, they defeated Lills Jarding who received 3,537 votes and Nick Reid who received 2,316 votes. In June 2018, Howard received 2,183 votes along with Johnson who received 2,215 votes and they advanced to the general election after defeating Melanie Torno who received 1,212 votes.
 In November 2016, Howard was elected to the South Dakota House of Representatives with 7,018 votes along with Johnson, who received 8,245 votes and they defeated Jim Hadd who received 3,226 votes and Ethan Marsland who received 2,777 votes. In June 2016, Howard received 1,792 votes and advanced from the primary along with Johnson, who received 2,235 votes and they defeated Mike Buckingham who received 1,099 votes.

References

1968 births
21st-century American politicians
21st-century American women politicians
Candidates in the 2022 United States House of Representatives elections
Living people
Republican Party members of the South Dakota House of Representatives
People from Decatur, Georgia
People from Rapid City, South Dakota
People from Sioux Falls, South Dakota
University of South Dakota alumni
Women state legislators in South Dakota